Acappella is an all-male contemporary Christian vocal group founded in 1982 by Keith Lancaster, who has been the singer, songwriter, and producer throughout the group's history. The group only consists of vocalists who sing in a cappella style without instrumental accompaniment.

Acappella's fan base steadily grew through the 1980s as the group experienced many lineup changes and constantly experimented with fresh new sounds. The landmark album, Sweet Fellowship (1988), ushered in one of the most significant developments in the group's membership and style. Lancaster stepped out of the group as lead singer to focus on the role of producer and manager. The group continued to change after that, developing a unique sound that has been mimicked by countless groups around the world.

Signed to Word Records in 1990 (and later to Epic Records), Acappella's popularity soared with releases such as Rescue, We Have Seen His Glory, All That I Need, and Set Me Free. Media exposure included television appearances, while the song "More Precious Than Gold" became the centerpiece of a Sony Camcorder television commercial and was broadcast across the USA. Hymns For All The World helped to increase the group's exposure internationally. Acappella has toured extensively around the world, singing in Africa, Australia, Canada, China, Europe, Jamaica, Japan, South America and the Caribbean in addition to thousands of concerts in the United States.

In 1986, Lancaster launched a spinoff group called Acappella Vocal Band (AVB). AVB originally opened and sang backup for Acappella, then branched off to tour on its own under the Acappella Ministries umbrella from 1988 to 2000.

After exploring various musical styles over more than three decades, Acappella has returned to its roots, utilizing an extensive host of alumni vocalists to fill current concerts. Acappella's worldwide impact was recognized with the group's 2007 induction into the Christian Music Hall of Fame.

Membership

Current members
Acappella changed its format in June 2014 (formally announced in August 2014). Acappella is not limited to one combination of singers. In fact, every concert features a special lineup drawn from veteran concert music ministers who have sung with Acappella across the years. It is not uncommon for a concert to feature vocalists ranging in ages in their 20s, 30s, 40s and 50s, drawing from Acappella's vast catalog of original songs.

Those who participate in concerts since the new format have included Rodney Britt, Wes McKinzie, Gary Evans, Ken McAlpin, Robert C. Guy, Robin Brannon, Duane Adams, Wayburn Dean, Anthony Lancaster, Zac George, Nic Dunbar, Barry Wilson, George Pendergrass, Steve Maxwell, Sean Samuel, Keith Lancaster, Gary Moyers, Matt Sammons, Jabbarri Jones, Matt Nunnally, Kevin Schaffer, Zachary Wilson and AVB alumni Aaron Herman, Brishan Hatcher, and Jeremy Swindle.

Group formations

Previous members

Discography
The labels are taken from each of the albums' original releases; many of these albums have been re-released under new distributors. Lyrics to each of these albums along with scripture references and other relevant information can be found at Acadisc.com.

Before the group was named Acappella, it was briefly named "His Image"; the records released under that name are:
 Til He Comes (1982, Clifty Records)
 Heaven’s Gonna Shine (1983, Clifty Records)
 Made in His Image (1984, Clifty Records)

In addition to projects recorded under the Acappella name, the group collaborated with AVB, Keith Lancaster and other artists on numerous "Acappella Series", "Acappella Scripture Songs" and "Acappella Praise & Worship" albums in the 1990s. These projects include:

Compilations of Acappella, AVB, Keith Lancaster and other Acappella Company songs include:
 Hear It in Our Voice (1994, Word)
 Hear It in Our Voice II (1994, Word)
 Acappella Favorites (1995, Word)
 Hear It in Our Voice III (1995, The Acappella Company)
 Acappella Wedding Longplay (1999, The Acappella Company)
 Acappella Spirituals Longplay (1999, The Acappella Company)
 Acappella Family Christmas (1999, The Acappella Company)
 Acappella Gospel Longplay (2000, The Acappella Company)
 Acappella Classics Longplay (2000, The Acappella Company)
 Acappella Word of God Longplay (2000, The Acappella Company)

References

External links
Acappella Official Website
Acadisc.com – Official Lyrics Site of Acappella and the Christian a cappella subgenre
 Official Brazilian Website
A Cappella S.O.U.N.D.S ~ Singapore a cappella music scene

 Acappella partners with Compassion to help bring children out of poverty

American Christian musical groups
Professional a cappella groups
Musical collectives
Churches of Christ
Musical groups established in 1982
1982 establishments in Tennessee